The Al Tawheed Mosque is a mosque in Sana'a, Yemen. It lies in the eastern part of the city, southeast of Revolution Hospital and Alemaan Mosque, along the E Ring Road.

See also
 List of mosques in Yemen

References

Tawheed